Lee Dale Allen (December 28, 1934 – June 11, 2012) was an American wrestler and wrestling coach.

Biography
Lee Dale Allen was born on December 28, 1934. Originally from St. Francis, Kansas, Allen and his family moved to Sandy, Oregon (near Portland, Oregon) during the Dust Bowl in 1938. Being a star athlete in high school (winning four state titles), and college level (attending University of Oregon), Allen competed in two Olympics (1956, 1960). He is one of two of the only American wrestlers to make an Olympic Team in both Freestyle (1956) and Greco-Roman (1960). Allen was named the assistant coach of the 1972 and the 1976 USA Greco-Roman Olympic Team and was named the Head Coach for the 1980 Olympic Greco-Roman Olympic Team, which was later boycotted(1980 Olympic Boycott). Finally settling down in El Granada, California, he coached Skyline College in San Bruno for over 30 years, helped start BAWA (Bay Area Wrestling Association) and began the first women's wrestling program at Menlo College.

Allen's two daughters  (Both alumni of Menlo College) are also wrestlers. He was able to coach both his daughters through college where they both earned a pair of national titles and Most Valuable Wrestler awards as well as earning a Coach of the Year award himself (2009) presented by the WCWA (Women’s College Wrestling Association). In May 2010, Allen announced his retirement as Head Woman's Wrestling Coach at Menlo College. The Beijing Olympian, Marcie Van Dusen, was named the new Head Woman's Wrestling Coach for Menlo College. "We are extremely fortunate to hire someone of Marcie's caliber to continue the great tradition left behind by Lee Allen," Menlo College Athletic Director Keith Spataro said. "We are pleased to be the first intercollegiate wrestling program to hire a female head coach and, in doing so, set the trend for many others to follow."

Allen died on June 11, 2012 at the age of 77.

Wrestling career
World Team Member:
 1961 (Yokohama, Japan) – Freestyle (6th place)

World Team Coach:
 1973 (Tehran, Iran) – Greco-Roman
 1977 (Goteborg, Sweden) – Greco-Roman
 1978 (Mexico City, Mexico) – Greco-Roman
 1979 (San Diego, Calif., USA) – Greco-Roman

Olympic Team Member:
 1956 (Melbourne, Australia) – Freestyle (dnp)
 1960 (Rome, Italy) – Greco-Roman (8th place)

Olympic Coach:
 1980 (Moscow, U.S.S.R.)

Hall of Fame Inductions:
 1997 – Portland State University Hall of Fame 
 1998 – San Mateo County Sports Hall of Fame 
 2001 – California Wrestling Hall of Fame 
 2003 – Skyline College Hall of Fame 
 2007 – AAU Wrestling Hall of Fame 
 2011 – Oregon Chapter National Wrestling Hall of Fame 
 2013 – California Chapter National Wrestling Hall of Fame 
 2018 – National Wrestling Hall of Fame

References

 Sources
 "Olympic history", TheMat.com.
 https://web.archive.org/web/20080726202545/http://www.fortunecity.com/olympia/romario/912/gnews87.htm
 Retiring Allen Hands Women's Wrestling to Olympian VanDusen
 Lee Allen Bio, Stats, and Results | Olympics at Sports-Reference.com
 "2011-12 Women's Wrestling Coaches", Menloathletics.com.

1934 births
2012 deaths
Olympic wrestlers of the United States
Wrestlers at the 1956 Summer Olympics
Wrestlers at the 1960 Summer Olympics
American male sport wrestlers
Oregon Ducks wrestlers
People from Sandy, Oregon
Wrestlers from Oregon
People from San Mateo County, California
People from St. Francis, Kansas